Töö Ashuu, literally "camel mountain pass", is a mountain pass in Kyrgyzstan on the highway from Bishkek to Osh (European route E010) in Kyrgyzstan approximately 120 km from Bishkek. The pass goes over part of the Kyrgyz Alatau range of the Tien Shan mountains. In the 1960s a  road tunnel was built under the pass at  elevation, bypassing the uppermost part of the pass road.

A ski resort is situated on the south slope of the Too Ashuu pass at 2960 m.a.s.l. The resort has one blue  ski slope operated by a chairlift with height difference of 200 m. There is a possibility to ski further 1500 m down to the highway. Shuttle marshrutkas then take the skiers back to the top section of the resort.

References

External links
 Official website of the ski resort
 Google map image showing the length of the tunnel. (as with much of the road over this pass, potholes limit vehicle speeds to around 20 km/h).

Mountain passes of Kyrgyzstan
Ski areas and resorts in Kyrgyzstan
Tian Shan